Bravo Eddy is a 1969  musical single by Jean Narcy (1932-2014), which celebrates Belgian cycling champion Eddy Merckx. The lyrics were written by J. Postule, C. Avranches, J. Narcy and H. Delfosse. It was released by Decca.

Lyrics

There are two versions of the song. The first one was recorded in 1969. A second version was released in 1970.

The song sings about how Eddy Merckx is "the king of cycling", applauded by "the entire world". It describes how every applauds and shouts his name as "the little Belgian" zooms by. The singer describes him as unbeatable and someone "who makes Roger Pingeon and Felice Gimondi suffer."

Dutch-language translation

A Dutch-language version was released around the same time, but recorded by a different artist: Janneman.

Sources

1969 songs
1969 singles
Belgian pop songs
French-language Belgian songs
Dutch-language Belgian songs
Songs about Belgium
Songs about Eddy Merckx
Songs about bicycles
Cycling music
Cultural depictions of Eddy Merckx